Hiệp Hưng is a village and commune in the Phụng Hiệp District of Hậu Giang, Vietnam.

Populated places in Hậu Giang province